The Moeraki Boulders (officially Moeraki Boulders / Kaihinaki) are unusually large spherical boulders lying along a stretch of Koekohe Beach on the wave-cut Otago coast of New Zealand between Moeraki and Hampden. They occur scattered either as isolated or clusters of boulders within a stretch of beach where they have been protected in a scientific reserve. These boulders are grey-colored septarian concretions, which have been exhumed from the mudstone and bedrock enclosing them and concentrated on the beach by coastal erosion. Especially in recent years, the boulders have been a popular tourist attraction.

Description
The most striking aspect of the boulders is their unusually large size and spherical shape, with a distinct bimodal size distribution. Most are spherical or almost spherical, but a small proportion are slightly elongated parallel to the bedding plane of the mudstone that once enclosed them.

Neither the spherical to subspherical shape or large size of the Moeraki Boulders is unique to them. Virtually identical spherical boulders, called Koutu Boulders, are found on the beaches, in the cliffs, and beneath the surface inland of the shore of Hokianga Harbour, North Island, New Zealand, between Koutu and Kauwhare points. Like the Moeraki Boulders, the Koutu Boulders are large, reaching  in diameter, and almost spherical. These concretions occur as both spherical cannonball concretions and flat, disk-shaped or oval concretions. Unlike the Moeraki boulders, some of these concretions contain the bones of mosasaurs and plesiosaurs.

Similar large spherical concretions have been found in many other countries.

Composition 

Detailed analysis of the fine-grained rock using optical mineralogy, X-ray crystallography, and electron microprobe has determined that the boulders consist of mud, fine silt and clay, cemented by calcite. The degree of cementation varies from being relatively weak in the interior of a boulder to quite hard at its outside rim. The outside rims of the larger boulders consist of as much as 10 to 20% calcite because the calcite not only tightly cements the silt and clay but has also replaced it to a significant degree.

The rock comprising the bulk of a boulder is riddled with large cracks called septaria that radiate outward from a hollow core lined with scalenohedral calcite crystals. The process or processes that created septaria within Moeraki Boulders, and in other septarian concretions, remain an unresolved matter for which a number of possible explanations have been proposed. These cracks radiate and thin outward from the centre of the typical boulder and are typically filled with an outer (early stage) layer of brown calcite and an inner (late stage) layer of yellow calcite spar, which often, but not always, completely fills the cracks. Rare Moeraki Boulders have a very thin innermost (latest stage) layer of dolomite and quartz covering the yellow calcite spar.

The composition of the Moeraki Boulders and the septaria that they contain are typical of, often virtually identical to, septarian concretions that have been found in exposures of sedimentary rocks in New Zealand and elsewhere. Smaller but otherwise very similar septarian concretions are found within exposures of sedimentary rocks elsewhere in New Zealand. Similar septarian concretions have been found in the Kimmeridge Clay and Oxford Clay of England, and at many other locations worldwide.

Origin 
The Moeraki Boulders are concretions created by the cementation of the Paleocene mudstone of the Moeraki Formation, from which they have been exhumed by coastal erosion. The main body of the boulders started forming in what was then marine mud, near the surface of the Paleocene sea floor. This is demonstrated by studies of their composition; specifically the magnesium and iron content, and stable isotopes of oxygen and carbon. Their spherical shape indicates that the source of calcium was mass diffusion, as opposed to fluid flow. The larger boulders,  in diameter, are estimated to have taken 4 to 5.5 million years to grow while  of marine mud accumulated on the seafloor above them. After the concretions formed, large cracks known as septaria formed in them. Brown calcite, yellow calcite, and small amounts of dolomite and quartz progressively filled these cracks when a drop in sea level allowed fresh groundwater to flow through the mudstone enclosing them.

Documentation and oral tradition 

Local Māori legends explained the boulders as the remains of eel baskets, calabashes, and kumara washed ashore from the wreck of Arai-te-uru, a large sailing canoe. This legend tells of the rocky shoals that extend seaward from Shag Point as being the petrified hull of this wreck and a nearby rocky promontory as being the body of the canoe's captain. Their reticulated patterning on the boulders, according to this legend, are the remains of the canoe's fishing nets.

In 1848, Walter Mantell sketched the beach and its boulders, more numerous than now. The picture is now in the Alexander Turnbull Library in Wellington.

See also
 Bowling Ball Beach
 Concretion
 List of rock formations of New Zealand
 Martian spherules
 Moqui Marbles
 Rock City, Kansas
 Stone spheres of Costa Rica

References

Further reading
 Brunsden, D., 1969, Mystery of the Moeraki and Katiki boulders. Geographical Magazine. v. 41, n. 11, pp. 839–843.
 Klug, H., and R. Zakrzewski, R., 1986, Die Moeraki Boulders; Riesenkonkretionen am Strand auf Neuseelands Suedinsel (The Moeraki boulders; giant concretions of the beach of New Zealand's South Island) Schriften des Naturwissenschaftlichen Vereins fuer Schleswig-Holstein. v. 56, pp. 47–52

External links 

 Moeraki Boulders

 Biek, B., 2002, Concretions and Nodules in North Dakota North Dakota Geological Survey, Bismarck, North Dakota.
 Hokianga Tourism Association, nd, Koutu boulders Pictures of cannonball concretions similar in size and origin to Moeraki Boulders.
 Irna, 2006, All that nature can never do, part IV : stone spheres
 Irna, 2007, Stone balls : in France too!
 Mozley, P.S., 1999, Concretions, Bombs, and Ground Water, Lite Geology, v. 14, p. 1-3 (Winter 1995)
 United States Geological Survey, nd, cannonball concretion

Beaches of Otago
Coastline of New Zealand
Rock formations of Otago